The 2015 FIBA Americas Under-16 Championship for Women was an international basketball competition that was held in Puebla, Mexico from 24–28 June 2015.

First round
All times are local (UTC−5).

Group A

Group B

Final round

Classification 5–8

Semifinals

Final classification games

Seventh place game

Fifth place game

Bronze medal game

Final

Awards

Final ranking

References

External links
2015 FIBA Americas U16 Championship for Women

FIBA Americas Under-16 Championship for Women
2015 in women's basketball
2014–15 in North American basketball
2014–15 in South American basketball
2015 in Mexican sports
International women's basketball competitions hosted by Mexico
Youth sport in Mexico